Navitski or Navicki is a Belarusian surname. Notable people with the surname include:

Henadz Navitski (born 1949), Belarusian politician

See also
 Nowicki
 Novitsky

Belarusian-language surnames